"You're Only Human (Second Wind)" is a song written and performed by Billy Joel  originally appeared on Greatest Hits – Volume I & Volume II in 1985. The song deals with teenage depression and suicide.

Background and recording
Joel, who said he once attempted suicide himself, stated in a 1985 interview that he wrote the song as a way to help young people struggling with depression and suicidal thoughts.
In its original draft, he was concerned the song sounded too depressing so he imbued it with a bouncy, joyous beat and melody, with lyrics emphasizing personal forgiveness and optimism. The song was originally titled simply "Second Wind” but Joel changed it to "You're Only Human" with "Second Wind" as the subtitle after drummer Liberty DeVitto mocked the name. Joel donated all royalties from the song to the National Committee for Youth Suicide Prevention.

During the song, Joel audibly chuckles after briefly hesitating and stuttering during one of the verses. At the prompting of Paul Simon and Christie Brinkley, who were listening in the studio, he left it in the finished recording as it seemed to illustrate the song's point about celebrating personal fallibility.

Reception
Cash Box said that the song has "a lilting reggae rhythm much like that in Julian Lennon’s 'Too Late For Goodbyes'" and  "Joel’s own inimitable sense of melodic and musical themes."  Billboard said that it has a "syncopated synthesized rhythm."

Personnel
Billy Joel – lead vocals, keyboards
David Brown – lead guitar
Russell Javors – rhythm guitar
Doug Stegmeyer – bass guitar 
Liberty DeVitto – drums
Jimmy Bralower – percussion
Peter Hewlett – background vocals
Frank Simms – background vocals
David Lebolt – synthesizer
Ronnie Cuber – syntharmonicas
Jon Faddis – syntharmonicas
Mark Rivera – syntharmonicas
David Matthews – horns arrangements

Music video
At the beginning of the video, Joel plays "Piano Man" on his harmonica. The entire video pays homage to the film It's a Wonderful Life, as the angelic Joel shows a suicidal young man threatening to jump off a bridge because of a break-up with his girlfriend what life will be like without him, as his family and friends mourn his death—as well as showing him the joys in his future he would be missing if he dies (e.g. high school graduation, marriage). The video ends with the young man choosing to live, and reconciling with his girlfriend when Joel plays "Piano Man" once again before tossing him his harmonica.

One of the extras in the music video is Adam Savage, who later found fame as the co-host of the popular science television show MythBusters.

The video was shot on Staten Island and Manhattan and features landmarks such as the 59th Street Bridge and Monsignor Farrell High School.

Single and album edits
The single version is 27 seconds shorter than the album version, removing the saxophone solo between the bridge and the third verse.

Charts

Weekly charts

Year-end charts

References

External links
Billy Joel - You're Only Human (Second Wind) (Official Video)

1985 singles
Billy Joel songs
Songs about suicide
Songs written by Billy Joel
Columbia Records singles
Songs about depression
Song recordings produced by Phil Ramone
1985 songs